Elachista bedellella is a moth of the family Elachistidae found in Europe.

Description
Adults are on wing from May to June and again in August in two generations per year.

The larvae feed on various species of grasses, including Arrhenatherum elatius, Avena, Avenula pratensis, Festuca ovina, Phleum, Poa nemoralis and Poa trivialis. They mine the leaves of their host plant. The mine has the form of a blotch in the leaf tip. A single larva may mine two to three leaves. Larvae can be found from September to the end of April and again (after overwintering within the mine) from June to July. Young larvae are yellowish white with a light brown head, while the body becomes grey green when they are full-grown.

Distribution
It is found from Scandinavia to the Iberian Peninsula, Italy and Bulgaria and from Great Britain to Russia.

References

bedellella
Leaf miners
Moths described in 1848
Moths of Europe
Taxa named by John Sircom